An ad hoc network refers to technologies that allow network communications on an ad hoc basis. Associated technologies include:
Wireless ad hoc network
Mobile ad hoc network
Vehicular ad hoc network
Intelligent vehicular ad hoc network
Protocols associated with ad hoc networking
Ad hoc On-Demand Distance Vector Routing
Ad Hoc Configuration Protocol
Smart phone ad hoc network
Ad hoc wireless distribution service

References

Computer networking